Machimia peperita is a moth in the family Depressariidae. It was described by Walsingham in 1912. It is found in Guatemala.

The wingspan is about 25 mm. The forewings are creamy whitish above the fold, blending to brownish creamy and very pale fawn-brownish outwardly and dorsally, speckled throughout, but especially beyond the cell, with abruptly square-ended brownish scale-points. There is a diffused, transverse, small smoky fuscous patch at the end of the cell and a less conspicuous spot, a little beyond the middle of the cell, diffused and widened upward to the costa, where it merges in a narrow shade of fawn-brownish      extending to the base and apex. There is a series of brownish fuscous dots around the termen and an outwardly curved transverse shade somewhat beyond the cell and a slight cloud beyond the middle of the fold are scarcely darker than the brownish creamy surrounding the wing. The hindwings are shining, very pale brownish cinereous, sparsely and inconspicuously speckled with single scales of a darker hue.

References

Moths described in 1912
Machimia